Cătălin Carp (born 20 October 1993) is a Moldovan professional footballer who plays as a defensive midfielder for Russian club Ufa.

Club career
Carp made his way through the youth system of the Ukrainian football club FC Shakhtar Donetsk.

In January 2012 Carp signed a three-year deal with Ukrainian Premier League side FC Dynamo Kyiv.

On 27 January 2017, he joined a Russian Premier League club FC Ufa on a 3.5-year contract. On 18 January 2021, he exercised the option to terminate his contract early.

On 28 October 2021, he signed a one-year contract with Romanian club Dinamo București.

On 13 July 2022, Carp returned to Ufa.

International career
On 14 August 2013, Carp made his debut for the Moldova national football team in a friendly match against Andorra.

Personal life
His father, Ilie Carp, was a football scout and coach, who previously managed in Moldova, Belarus, Kazakhstan and Azerbaijan.

Career statistics

Club

International goals
 Scores and results list Moldova's goal tally first.

Honours

Club
Steaua București
League Cup: 2015–16

Viitorul Constanța
Liga I: 2016–17

References

External links
 

1993 births
Footballers from Chișinău
Living people
Moldovan footballers
Association football defenders
Moldova youth international footballers
Moldova under-21 international footballers
Moldova international footballers
FC Dynamo-2 Kyiv players
CFR Cluj players
FC Steaua București players
FC Viitorul Constanța players
FC Ufa players
FC Tambov players
FC Dinamo București players
Ukrainian First League players
Liga I players
Russian Premier League players
Russian First League players
Moldovan expatriate footballers
Expatriate footballers in Ukraine
Moldovan expatriate sportspeople in Ukraine
Expatriate footballers in Romania
Moldovan expatriate sportspeople in Romania
Expatriate footballers in Russia
Moldovan expatriate sportspeople in Russia